The Las Vegas Bowl  is an NCAA Division I FBS annual post-season college football bowl game held in the Las Vegas area. First played in 1992, the bowl was originally held at the 40,000-seat Sam Boyd Stadium in Whitney, Nevada before moving to the 65,000-seat Allegiant Stadium in Paradise, Nevada in 2021. The bowl is owned and operated by ESPN Events.

Conference tie-ins
As the Las Vegas Bowl was effectively the replacement for the California Bowl, it inherited that bowl's tie-ins with the champions of the Big West Conference and the Mid-American Conference. These remained intact until 1996, after which the Big West's champion earned a berth in the Humanitarian Bowl while the MAC's champion was given a berth in the Motor City Bowl. 1997 through 1999 saw a team from the Western Athletic Conference face an at-large team, and the Mountain West Conference took over for the WAC for the 1999 and 2000 games (the 1999 game featured both WAC and Mountain West teams). Beginning in 2001, the Mountain West and Pac-12 Conferences (originally known as the Pacific-10 Conference) matched up in Las Vegas.

From 2001 until 2005, the second-place team in the Mountain West was chosen to face the Pac-12. Beginning in 2006, after its contract with the Liberty Bowl expired, the Mountain West agreed to send its champion to the Las Vegas Bowl to face the Pac-12's 5th or 6th-place team. From 2006 until 2013, the Mountain West would send a secondary team if the champion qualified for the Bowl Championship Series or, as per the rules of the Hawai'i Bowl, was Hawai'i. The 2016 game would have pitted the Pac-12's #6 team against the winner of the Mountain West Conference Football Championship Game, provided that the winner of the game does not automatically qualify for one of the College Football Playoff's six bowls as the highest-ranking member of the "Group of Five" (champions of the Mountain West, Sun Belt, American, or Mid-American Conferences, as well as the Conference USA champion comprise this group).  However, since the Pac-12 only had six bowl-eligible teams and two of them qualified for New Years Six bowls, the bowl elected to invite the Houston Cougars of the American Athletic Conference instead of a Pac-12 team.

To heighten the profile of the game with its move to Allegiant Stadium, the Las Vegas Bowl announced a new, five-year, alternating tie-in between the SEC and Big Ten beginning 2020. An SEC team will play the Las Vegas Bowl in even-numbered years, while a Big Ten team will play in odd-numbered years. The conference not playing in the Las Vegas Bowl will play in the Duke's Mayo Bowl (formerly Belk Bowl). The Mountain West moved its top selection from the Las Vegas Bowl to the newly-established LA Bowl.

History
The game originated from the California Raisin Bowl, which was played in Fresno from 1981 to 1991. In 1992, Fresno State, formerly of the Big West, moved to the Western Athletic Conference. The Big West and MAC then pulled out of Fresno and sought a new home for their conference champions. They found it in Las Vegas, where organizers were looking for a way to boost hotel revenue. In those days, the Christmas season was a slow period for Las Vegas hotels and casinos. The first Las Vegas Bowl was played in 1992.

The NCAA adopted an overtime rule for the 1995 post-season and all games thereafter. In 1995, Toledo defeated Nevada, 40–37, in the first ever overtime game in Division I-A college football. The following season, the policy of overtime was adopted for regular season games to break ties.

In 2001, ESPN Regional Television purchased the Las Vegas Bowl from the Las Vegas Convention and Visitors Authority.

On December 25, 2002, UCLA interim coach Ed Kezirian was victorious in his only game as the UCLA head coach as UCLA won 27–13 over New Mexico. In that game, New Mexico sent Katie Hnida in to kick an extra point which was the first time a woman played in a Division I Football Bowl Subdivision (née Division I-A) college football game. The kick was blocked.

The 2007 Las Vegas Bowl featured a rematch between Mountain West Champion BYU and UCLA who defeated BYU during the regular season. UCLA scored first on a field goal after a fumble by BYU quarterback Max Hall. BYU answered with a touchdown reception by Austin Collie.  BYU went up 17–6 with Michael Reed catch for a touchdown. A fumble by BYU with 19 seconds left in the first half allowed UCLA to score and cut the lead to 17–13. UCLA cut the deficit to 17–16 on a 50-yard field goal. With two minutes left UCLA took over at their own two-yard line.  They were able to drive down to the BYU 13-yard line with 3 seconds left.  The 28-yard field goal attempt was partially blocked by BYU defensive tackle Eathyn Manumaleuna and fell short giving BYU their second Vegas Bowl victory in three tries, also making the Cougars the first school to win back-to-back Las Vegas Bowls. The following year, though, the Arizona Wildcats denied BYU their third consecutive Las Vegas Bowl win by winning 31–21.

On September 25, 2013, Royal Purple was announced as the new title sponsor for the next three years. Following the expiration of Royal Purple's sponsorship of the title from 2013 to 2015, the game became officially known as the  Las Vegas Bowl.

With the relocation of the Oakland Raiders to Las Vegas, Allegiant Stadium was constructed to replace Sam Boyd Stadium. The Las Vegas Bowl along with the other events held at Sam Boyd Stadium moved to the new stadium upon completion.

On December 2, 2020, the 2020 edition of the game was cancelled due to the COVID-19 pandemic. Its tie-ins (SEC and Pac-12) were transferred to the ESPN Events-owned Armed Forces Bowl in Fort Worth, Texas.

Sponsors
The bowl was known as the SEGA Sports Las Vegas Bowl from 2001 to 2002. From 2003 to 2008, the title sponsor was the Pioneer Corporation. From 2009 to 2012, the game was known as the Maaco Bowl Las Vegas, as the sponsor was MAACO. From 2013 to 2015, the game was known as the Royal Purple Las Vegas Bowl as the sponsor was Royal Purple.  For the 2016 edition, the game was known as the Las Vegas Bowl presented by GEICO as GEICO was the presenting sponsor.  On July 12, 2018, it was announced that Mitsubishi would be the new title sponsor, with the game renamed as the Mitsubishi Motors Las Vegas Bowl as part of a two-year deal. On April 20, 2021, SRS Distribution signed a five-year agreement with ESPN to become the title sponsor, making the game the SRS Distribution Las Vegas Bowl.

Game results
Rankings per AP Poll prior to the game being played.

Source:

MVPs

Most appearances
Updated through the December 2022 edition (30 games, 60 total appearances).

Teams with multiple appearances

 Includes December 2022 appearance

Teams with a single appearance
Won (8): Arizona, Bowling Green, California, North Carolina, Toledo, Utah State, Wisconsin, Wyoming

Lost (5): Air Force, Arkansas, Central Michigan, Colorado State, Florida, Houston

Appearances by conference
Updated through the December 2022 edition (30 games, 60 total appearances).

 Pac-12 record includes appearances when the conference was known as the Pac-10 (before 2011).
 Conferences that are defunct or no longer active in FBS are marked in italics.
 Independent appearances: BYU (2015)

Game records

Source:

Media coverage

The Las Vegas Bowl has been televised by ABC since 2013; ABC also televised the game in 2001. Other editions of the game were broadcast by ESPN or ESPN2.

References

External links
Official website

 
College football bowls
Recurring sporting events established in 1992